
Noyce, an English surname derived from the more common surname Noyes, may refer to:

 Dora Noyce, Scottish brothel keeper
 Graham Noyce, English motocross racer
 Jonathan Noyce, English musician
 Mark Noyce, English actor and film director
 Phillip Noyce, Australian film director
 Robert Noyce, American inventor and Intel co-founder
 Wilfrid Noyce, English mountaineer and author

English-language surnames
Patronymic surnames